Royal Bank was a private commercial bank established as ÖZ BANK on 2 August 1993. The bank provided financial services for individual customers, small- and mid-size businesses. The last supervisory board took the control over the bank in 2004 and initiated a program on restructuring the financial and control systems.

Royal Bank was included into the Baku Stock Exchange in 2006. It had 32 regional branches including the branches in Baku.

On 12 July 2015, Central Bank of Azerbaijan cancelled the license of Royal Bank due to the unfulfilled liabilities and the written notifications of the Central Bank. On 2 August 2015, the Administrative Economic Court in Baku announced that Royal Bank went bankrupt.

See also

 Banking in Azerbaijan
 Central Bank of Azerbaijan
 List of banks in Azerbaijan
 Azerbaijani manat
 Economy of Azerbaijan

References

External links
Royal Bank web site

Government of Azerbaijan
Economy of Azerbaijan
Banks of Azerbaijan
Banks established in 1993